René Klingenburg (born 29 December 1993) is a German professional footballer who plays as a midfielder for 1. FC Kaiserslautern.

Club career
Born in Oberhausen, Klingenburg signed his first professional contract with FC Schalke 04 in December 2012. In January 2015, Klingenburg joined Viktoria Köln on a contract until 2016. Klingenburg then joined Rot Weiss Ahlen in the summer of 2016, before returning to Schalke in January 2017. He joined Preußen Münster on a one-year contract ahead of the 2018–19 season. On 27 May 2019, Klingenburg joined Dynamo Dresden on a three-year contract ahead of the upcoming 2019–20 season.

References

External links
 

1993 births
Living people
Sportspeople from Oberhausen
Footballers from North Rhine-Westphalia
German footballers
Association football midfielders
FC Schalke 04 II players
FC Schalke 04 players
FC Viktoria Köln players
Rot Weiss Ahlen players
SC Preußen Münster players
Dynamo Dresden players
1. FC Kaiserslautern players
2. Bundesliga players
3. Liga players
Regionalliga players